Adarius Bowman (born July 10, 1985) is a former American professional gridiron football wide receiver in the Canadian Football League (CFL). He was signed by the Saskatchewan Roughriders as an undrafted free agent in 2008. Bowman has also been a member Winnipeg Blue Bombers, Montreal Alouettes, and Edmonton Eskimos/Elks. He played college football at Oklahoma State. Bowman was a Grey Cup Champion and three time CFL All-Star having accumulated 652 receptions for 9,491 yards and 49 touchdowns in 141 career games.

Early years
Bowman was ranked by ESPN as the top wide receiver in Tennessee while playing at Notre Dame High School. Not only did he catch passes on offense, but also had 4 interceptions and 75 tackles as a junior on defense. Bowman had 293 receiving yards and 5 touchdowns (a losing effort) in a 2001 game against The McCallie School, the eventual TSSAA Division II-AAA Champions.  He played in the 2003 U.S. Army All-American Bowl.

In high school, Bowman excelled in track and basketball. In track, he won state titles in the 4x100 relay and triple jump. He also was selected to play in the annual Tennessee vs. Georgia game in his senior year of basketball.

College career

North Carolina
After graduating from high school, Bowman began his collegiate career at North Carolina. As a true freshman, Bowman played in all 12 games but only started 2. During the span of the 12 games, he netted 181 receiving yards and two touchdowns. Although he had played in every game the previous season, Bowman only saw action 6 times during the 2004 season. Despite playing in fewer games than in the previous season, he managed to amass 329 receiving yards and 3 touchdowns.

Oklahoma State
Between the 2004 and 2005 seasons, Bowman transferred to Oklahoma State, where he would become a college football standout under first-year head coach Mike Gundy. He was redshirted during his junior year, but was back on the field in 2006.

In his first game in an Oklahoma State uniform, a 52–10 win over Missouri State, Bowman reeled in a 19-yard touchdown plus two other passes totaling 28 yards. A few weeks later, in the game against Kansas that came to define his career, he pulled down 13 passes totaling a Big 12 record 300 yards. His four touchdowns, including a 64-yarder from Bobby Reid, made him a candidate for ESPN's College Football Player of the Week. By the end of the season, he had caught 60 passes—51 of which resulted in first down or touchdown yardage.

After the season ended, Bowman was named Big 12 Offensive Newcomer of the Year by both the Associated Press and the Big 12 coaches. At the team's football banquet, he was presented with the Bob Fenimore Award, which is presented annually to Oklahoma State's Most Valuable Player.

Going into his senior season, Bowman was ranked as one of the top receiver prospects in the 2008 NFL Draft. Mel Kiper Jr. ranked him as the 19th overall senior prospect before the season. He had a rather disappointing season in 2007, only catching 61 passes for 932 yards and 7 touchdowns.

Professional career

2008 NFL Draft
Bowman was once regarded as a potential first-round pick in the 2008 NFL Draft, but a string of events led to him going undrafted. First, an injury suffered against Kansas after a hit by future NFL player Aqib Talib caused him to miss the final two games of the regular season and scouts to question his durability. Next, poor performances at the Senior Bowl and practices preceding it caused his stock to drop further. At the 2008 NFL Combine, he ran a 4.74 40 yard dash, and had an even slower time at Oklahoma State's Pro Day. However, he was still projected as a late-round draft pick. After going undrafted, he also went unsigned as a rookie free agent, despite drawing interest by the Dallas Cowboys and Philadelphia Eagles.

Saskatchewan Roughriders
After failing to sign with an NFL team following the 2008 NFL Draft, Bowman signed a contract with the Saskatchewan Roughriders of the Canadian Football League (CFL) in May 2008. Bowman erupted for 112 yards and a touchdown on six catches in his debut for the Saskatchewan Roughriders. His 73-yard TD clinched Saskatchewan's win over the Edmonton Eskimos.

Winnipeg Blue Bombers
Bowman was traded to the Winnipeg Blue Bombers from the Saskatchewan Roughriders on April 1, 2009. He was traded along with non-import offensive lineman Jean-Francois Morin-Roberge, and non-import safety Brady Browne in exchange for import offensive lineman Dan Goodspeed. The Roughriders then traded Goodspeed to the Hamilton Tiger Cats for non-import offensive lineman Jordan Rempel.  Bowman finished the year with 925 receiving yards and 6 touchdowns. Bowman struggled with dropped passes in the 2010 season, a recurring theme in his career to this point, which contributed to a difficult Blue Bombers' season. After failing to rectify this problem, he was demoted from the starting line-up and was eventually released on Oct. 20, 2010.

Edmonton Eskimos
On January 19, 2011, Bowman was signed by the Edmonton Eskimos. The 2011 CFL season was a breakout year for Bowman, recording 1,153 yards and 4 touchdowns. On November 5, Bowman had a career game, collecting 226 yards with 2 touchdowns. Bowman's second season with the Eskimos was cut short when in the second game of the season he suffered a torn ACL and MCL in his left knee. On July 9, 2012, the Eskimos announced that Bowman would miss the remainder of the 2012 CFL season. In his sixth season in the CFL, Bowman played in only the final 9 games after missing the first half of the season with an injury. Despite missing half the season Bowman still had a strong year accumulating 697 receiving yards and 5 touchdowns. On December 2, 2013, Bowman signed a two-year extension with Edmonton.

Bowman's 2014 CFL season was the best season of his career at that time, as Bowman led the league in receiving yards with 1,456, which was 376 yards ahead of second place. His 112 receptions were the most since Jamel Richardson's 112-catch season in 2011. Bowman followed up a strong 2014 season with another strong year in 2015. Adarius Bowman played in all but 2 of the regular season games in 2015; finishing the year with 93 receptions for 1,304 yards with 7 touchdowns. Bowman was named a CFL All-star for the 2015 campaign; his second year in a row. The Eskimos prevented Bowman from becoming a free-agent when they signed him to a new contract that will keep him playing in Edmonton through the 2017 CFL season. Bowman led the CFL in both receptions (120) and yards (1,761) in the 2016 season, setting career highs in receptions, yards and touchdowns (9). He was named a CFL All-Star for the third consecutive season. At the end of January 2017, he signed a contract extension keeping him with the Eskimos through the 2018 CFL season. The new contract made Bowman the highest paid receiver in the league. The deal included a $140,000 signing bonus with a base salary of $260,000 for 2017, and increasing by $5,000 in 2018. After playing in the first three games of the 2017 season Bowman was placed on the six-game injured list with a hamstring injury. Following the season, on February 5, 2018, Bowman was released by the Eskimos; the same day he was set to receive a $140,000 roster bonus.

Winnipeg Blue Bombers (II) 
Only four days after being released by the Eskimos, Bowman signed a one-year contract with the Winnipeg Blue Bombers. He played in six games for the Blue Bombers, registering receptions in only three of those games with no touchdowns.

Montreal Alouettes 
Following a slow start to the 2018 season, Bowman was traded to the Montreal Alouettes on July 23, 2018 to replace the recently traded Chris Williams. In 11 games with Montreal, Bowman recorded 30 catches for 372 yards, including catching the first CFL touchdown pass thrown by Johnny Manziel courtesy of a trick play. He was not re-signed following the season and became a free-agent in February 2019. Bowman announced his retirement from professional football on October 17, 2019.

Edmonton Elks (II)
On January 26, 2022, the Edmonton Elks announced Bowman (age 36) would be coming out of retirement and returning for the 2022 CFL season. This ultimately proved to be short lived as Bowman announced his retirement on March 16, 2022.

Career statistics

References

External links
 Montreal Alouettes profile

1985 births
Living people
African-American players of Canadian football
American football wide receivers
Canadian football slotbacks
Edmonton Elks players
Montreal Alouettes players
North Carolina Tar Heels football players
Oklahoma State Cowboys football players
Saskatchewan Roughriders players
Sportspeople from Chattanooga, Tennessee
Winnipeg Blue Bombers players
21st-century African-American sportspeople
20th-century African-American people